Lythria purpuraria, the purple-barred yellow,  is a species of moth of the family Geometridae. It is found from western Europe to Siberia, Russia, Ukraine, Turkmenistan and Kazakhstan. 

L. purpuraria generally have two red-purple transverse lines in their green-yellow forewings. They are often confused with L. cruentaria, a sister species in the same family. This is because they are both available in a variety of sizes with multiple wing patterns. L. purpuraria and the other four species within the Lythria family have a very difficult genitalia structure, which is complicated to analyze and study.

Adults are on wing from April to June and again from July to September. It is a day-flying species. There are two generations per year.

The larvae feed on prostrate knotweed, also known as Polygonum aviculare.

External links
Fauna Europaea
Lepiforum.de

References

Lythriini
Moths of Europe
Moths of Asia
Taxa named by Carl Linnaeus